Leon Adolphe Amette (6 September 1850 Douville-sur-Andelle, Eure – 29 August 1920 Antony, Hauts-de-Seine) was a French Catholic cardinal who was archbishop of Paris from 1908 to 1920.

He was made a cardinal in 1911 with the rank of cardinal priest and the title of S. Sabina. He participated in the 1914 papal conclave which elected Pope Benedict XV. He consecrated the Basilique du Sacré-Coeur in 1919.

External links

 photo
 Catholic Hierarchy 

1850 births
1920 deaths
People from Eure
20th-century French cardinals
Archbishops of Paris
Burials at Notre-Dame de Paris
Cardinals created by Pope Pius X